Atlético Choloma is a Honduran football club that plays its home games at Estadio Rubén Deras in Choloma, Cortés.

History

Atlético Infop
Known as Atlético Infop until 2008, the club was renamed Atlético Choloma in 2008.

Founded only in 2008, Atlético Choloma defeated Parrillas One in the 2010–11 promotion on 18 June 2011, which earned them a spot in the 2011–12 Liga Nacional.

In April 2013, they were relegated under Edwin Pavón which made Pavón the Honduran coach with most relegations in Honduran football history.

Achievements
Liga de Ascenso
Winners (1): 2010–11 C
Runners-up (2): 2009–10 A, 2013–14 A

League performance

Current squad

All Time Top Scorers

    Oscar Torlacoff (29)

References

 
Football clubs in Honduras
Association football clubs established in 1999
1999 establishments in Honduras